Ischia  is a volcanic island in the Tyrrhenian Sea. It is the largest of the Phlegrean Islands. The island is very densely populated, with 62,000 residents (more than 1,300 inhabitants per square km).

Ischia is also well known for its thermal water and thermal gardens used since ancient times. Its volcanic nature makes Ischia one of the largest spas in Europe. Ischia's thermal waters are alkaline. Already the first Euboic settlers (8th century BC), as evidenced by the numerous archaeological finds found in the site of Pithecusa and preserved in the Archaeological Museum of Villa Arbusto in Lacco Ameno, appreciated and used the waters of the island's thermal springs. The Greeks, in fact, used the thermal waters to restore the spirit and the body and as a remedy for the healing of the after-effects of war wounds (in the pre-antibiotic era), attributing supernatural powers to the waters and vapors that gushed from the earth; it is no coincidence that temples dedicated to divinities such as that of Apollo in Delphi rose in every spa town. Strabo, a Greek historian and geographer, mentions the island of Ischia and the virtues of its thermal springs in his monumental geographical work (Geograph. Lib. V). If the Greeks were the first peoples to learn about the powers of thermal waters, the Romans exalted them as an instrument of care and relaxation through the creation of public Thermae and they used the numerous springs of the island surely and profitably (as evidenced by the votive tablets found at the Source of Nitrodi in Barano d'Ischia, where there was a small temple dedicated to Apollo and to the Nitrodie Nymphs, guardians of the waters) even without lavish settlements; In fact, on the island, as in Rome and in other ancient thermal centres, no impressive vestiges of thermal buildings have been found, probably due to volcanic eruptions and earthquakes that frequently violently shook the crags. The decline of the power of Rome coincided with the abandonment of the use of bathrooms also in Ischia: in fact, there are no traces of the use of water in the Middle Ages.

Ischia is the name of the main comune of the island. The other comuni of the island are Barano d'Ischia, Casamicciola Terme, Forio, Lacco Ameno and Serrara Fontana.

Geology and geography
The roughly trapezoidal island is formed by a complex volcano immediately southwest of the Campi Flegrei area at the western side of the Bay of Naples. The eruption of the trachytic Green Tuff Ignimbrite about 56,000 years ago was followed by caldera formation. The highest point of the island, Monte Epomeo, is a volcanic horst consisting of green tuff that was submerged after its eruption and then uplifted. Volcanism on the island has been significantly affected by tectonism that formed a series of horsts and grabens; resurgent doming produced at least  of uplift during the past 33,000 years. Many small monogenetic volcanoes formed around the uplifted block. Volcanism during the Holocene produced a series of pumiceous tephras, tuff rings, lava domes, and lava flows. The last eruption of Ischia, in 1302, produced a spatter cone and the Arso lava flow, which reached the NE coast.

The surrounding waters, including gulfs of Gaeta, Naples and Pozzuoli are both rich and healthy, providing habitat to around seven species of whales and dolphins, including massive fin and sperm whales. Special research programmes on local cetaceans have been conducted to monitor and protect this bio-diversity.

Name

Virgil poetically referred to it as Inarime and still later as Arime. Martianus Capella followed Virgil in this allusive name, which was never in common circulation: the Romans called it Aenaria, the Greeks, Πιθηκοῦσαι, Pithekoūsai.

(In)arime and Pithekousai both appear to derive from words for "monkey" (Etruscan arimos, Ancient Greek πίθηκος, píthēkos, "monkey"). However, Pliny derives the Greek name from the local clay deposits, not from píthēkos; he explains the Latin name Aenaria as connected to a landing by Aeneas (Princeton Encyclopedia). If the island actually was, like Gibraltar, home to a population of monkeys, they were already extinct by historical times as no record of them is mentioned in ancient sources.

The current name appears for the first time in a letter from Pope Leo III to Charlemagne in 813: the name iscla mentioned there would allegedly derive from insula, though there is an argument made for a Semitic origin in I-schra, "black island".

History

Ancient times
An acropolis site of the Monte Vico area was inhabited from the Bronze Age, as Mycenaean and Iron Age pottery findings attest. Euboean Greeks from Eretria and Chalcis arrived in the 8th century BC to establish an emporium for trade with the Etruscans of the mainland. This settlement was home to a mixed population of Greeks, Etruscans, and Phoenicians. Because of its fine harbor and the safety from raids afforded by the sea, the settlement of Pithecusae became successful through trade in iron and with mainland Italy; in 700 BC, Pithecusae was home to 5,000–10,000 people.

The ceramic Euboean artifact inscribed with a reference to "Nestor's Cup" was discovered in a grave on the island in 1953. Engraved upon the cup are a few lines written in the Greek alphabet. Dating from c. 730 BC, it is one of the most important testimonies of the early Greek alphabet, from which the Latin alphabet descended via the Etruscan alphabet. According to certain scholars, the inscription also might be the oldest written reference to the Iliad.

In 474 BC, Hiero I of Syracuse came to the aid of the Cumaeans, who lived on the mainland opposite Ischia, against the Etruscans and defeated them on the sea. He occupied Ischia and the surrounding Parthenopean islands and left behind a garrison to build a fortress before the city of Ischia itself. This was still extant in the Middle Ages, but the original garrison fled before the eruptions of 470 BC and the island was taken over by Neapolitans. The Romans seized Ischia (and Naples) in 322 BC.

From 1st century AD to 16th century

In 6 AD, Augustus restored the island to Naples in exchange for Capri. Ischia suffered from the barbarian invasions, being taken first by the Heruli and then by the Ostrogoths, being ultimately absorbed into the Eastern Roman Empire. The Byzantines gave the island over to Naples in 588, and by 661, it was being administered by a Count liege to the Duke of Naples. The area was devastated by the Saracens in 813 and 847; in 1004 it was occupied by Henry II of Germany; the Norman Roger II of Sicily took it in 1130 granting the island to the Norman Aldoyn de Candida created Count d'Ischia; the island was raided by the Pisans in 1135 and 1137 and subsequently fell under the Hohenstaufen and then Angevin rule. After the Sicilian Vespers in 1282, the island rebelled, recognizing Peter III of Aragon, but was retaken by the Angevins the following year. It was conquered in 1284 by the forces of Aragon, and Charles II of Anjou was unable to successfully retake it until 1299.

As a consequence of the island's last eruption in 1302, the population fled to Baia, where they remained for 4 years. In 1320 Robert of Anjou and his wife Sancia visited the island and were hosted by Cesare Sterlich, who had been sent by Charles II from the Holy See to govern the island in 1306 and was by this time nearly 100 years of age.

Ischia suffered greatly in the struggles between the Angevin and Durazzo dynasties. It was taken by Carlo Durazzo in 1382, retaken by Louis II of Anjou in 1385 and captured yet again by Ladislaus of Naples in 1386; it was sacked by the fleet of the Antipope John XXIII under the command of Gaspare Cossa in 1410 only to be retaken by Ladislaus the following year. In 1422 Joan II gave the island to her adoptive son Alfonso V of Aragon, though, when he fell into disgrace, she retook it with the help of Genoa in 1424. In 1438 Alfonso reoccupied the castle, kicking out all the men and proclaiming it an Aragonese colony, marrying to his garrison the wives and daughters of the expelled. He set about building a bridge linking the castle to the rest of the island, and he carved out a large gallery, both of which are still to be seen today. In 1442, he gave the island to one of his favorites, Lucretia d'Alagno, who in turn entrusted the island's governance to her brother-in-law, Giovanni Torella. Upon the death of Alfonso in 1458, they returned the island to the Angevin side. Ferdinand I of Naples ordered Alessandro Sforza to chase Torella out of the castle and gave the island over, in 1462, to Garceraldo Requesens. In 1464, after a brief Torellan insurrection, Marino Caracciolo was set up as governor.

In February 1495, with the arrival of Charles VIII, Ferdinand II landed on the island and took possession of the castle, and, after having killed the disloyal castellan Giusto di Candida with his own hands, left the island under the control of Innico d'Avalos, marquis of Pescara and Vasto, who ably defended the place from the French flotilla. With him came his sister Costanza and through them, they founded the D'Avalos dynasty, which would last on the island into the 18th century.

16th–18th centuries
Throughout the 16th century, the island suffered the incursions of pirates and Barbary privateers from North Africa: in 1543 and 1544 Hayreddin Barbarossa laid waste to the island, taking 4,000 prisoners in the process. In 1548 and 1552, Ischia was beset by his successor Dragut Rais. With the increasing rarity and diminishing severity of the piratical attacks later in the century and the construction of better defences, the islanders began to venture out of the castle, and it was then that the historic centre of the town of Ischia was begun. Even so, many inhabitants still ended up slaves to the pirates, the last known being taken in 1796.

During the 1647 revolution of Masaniello, there was an attempted rebellion against the feudal landowners.

Since the 18th century

With the extinction of the D'Avalos line in 1729, the island reverted to state property. In March 1734, it was taken by the Bourbons and administered by a royal governor seated within the castle. The island participated in the short-lived Republic of Naples starting in March 1799, but by 3 April, Commodore Thomas Troubridge under the command of Lord Nelson had put down the revolt on Ischia as well as on neighboring Procida. By decree of the governor, many of the rebels were hanged in a square on Procida, now Piazza dei Martiri (Square of the Martyrs). Among these was Francesco Buonocore, who had received the island to administer from the French Championnet in Naples. On 13 February 1806, the island was occupied by the French, and on the 24th was unsuccessfully attacked by the British.

On 21 and 22 June 1809, the islands of Ischia and Procida were attacked by an Anglo-Bourbon fleet.  Procida surrendered on 24 June and Ischia soon afterwards. However, the British soon returned to their bases in Sicily and Malta.
In the 19th century Ischia was a popular travel destination for European nobility.

On 28 July 1883, an earthquake destroyed the villages of Casamicciola Terme and Lacco Ameno.

Ischia developed into a well-known artist colony at the beginning of the 20th century. Writers and painters from all over the world were attracted. Eduard Bargheer, Hans Purrmann and Arrigo Wittler lived on the island. Rudolf Levy, Werner Gilles, Max Peiffer Watenphul with Kurt Craemer and Vincent Weber stayed in the fishing village of Sant'Angelo on the southern tip of the island shortly before the outbreak of the Second World War. In 1936 Ischia had a population of 30,418.

Spa tourism did not resume again until the early 1950s. At that time, a quite remarkable artist colony of writers, composers and visual artists lived in Forio, including Ingeborg Bachmann. Elizabeth Taylor and Luchino Visconti stayed here for filming.

On 21 August 2017 Ischia experienced a 4.2 magnitude earthquake which killed two people and injured 42 more.

On 26 November 2022, a storm and resulting landslide killed 12 people.

In literature and the arts

Events
The island is home to the Ischia Film Festival, an international cinema competition celebrated in June or July, dedicated to all the works that have promoted the value of the local territory.

Notable guests and works
The Italian politician Giuseppe Garibaldi, one of the most important figures of Italian unification, stayed on the island to heal himself from a serious injury and find relief in the peaceful area of Casamicciola Terme (at the Manzi Hotel).
The Russian revolutionary Mikhail Bakunin, stayed in Ischia between July 1866 and June 1867, from where he wrote political letters to Alexander Herzen and Nikolai Ogarev.
In May 1948 W. H. Auden wrote his poem "In Praise of Limestone" here, the first poem he wrote in Italy.
In 1949, British classical composer William Walton settled in Ischia. In 1956, he sold his London house and took up full-time residence on Ischia; he built a hilltop house at Forio, called it La Mortella, and Susana Walton created a magnificent garden there. Walton lived on the island for the remainder of his life and died there in 1983.
German composer Hans Werner Henze lived on the island from 1953 to 1956 and wrote his Quattro Poemi (1955) there.
Samuel Taylor's Broadway play Avanti! (1968) takes place on the island.
Hergé's series of comic albums, The Adventures of Tintin (1907–1983), ends in Ischia, which serves as the location of Endaddine Akass' villa in the unfinished 24th and final book, Tintin and Alph-Art.
French novelist Pascal Quignard set much of his novel Villa Amalia (2006) on the island.
In Elena Ferrante's series of Neapolitan Novels, the island serves as the setting of several summer holidays of the main characters.
 Ischia is the setting for most of the novel The Singer's Gun (2010) by Emily St.John Mandel

Film setting
In addition to the works noted above, multiple media works have been set or filmed on the island. For example:
The American swashbuckler film The Crimson Pirate (1952) was filmed on and around the island during the summer of 1951.
Part of Purple Noon (plein soleil 1959), directed by René Clément starring Alain Delon and Marie Laforet was filmed on the island.
Avanti! (1972), starring Jack Lemon and Juliet Mills.
Part of Cleopatra (1963), starring Elizabeth Taylor, was filmed on the island.
Ischia Ponte stood in for "Mongibello" in the Hollywood film The Talented Mr. Ripley (1999).
The American film And While We Were Here (2012), starring Kate Bosworth, was filmed on the island.
Castello Aragonese was used as the 'Riva's Fortified Fortress' island in Men in Black: International (2019).

Wines
The island of Ischia is home to the eponymous Denominazione di origine controllata (DOC) that produces both red and white wines though white wines account for nearly 80% of the island's wine production. Vineyards planted within the  boundaries of the DOC tend to be on volcanic soils with high pumice, phosphorus and potassium content.

The white wines of the island are composed primarily of Forastera (at least 65% according to DOC regulation) and Biancolella (up to 20%) with up to 15% of other local grape varieties such as Arilla and San Lunardo. Grapes are limited to a harvest yield of no more than 10 tonnes/ha with a finished minimum alcohol level of at least 11%. For wines labeled as Bianco Superiore, the yield is further restricted to a maximum of 8 tonnes/ha with a minimum alcohol level of 12%. Only certain subareas of the Ischia DOC can produce Bianco Superiore with the blend needing to contain 50% Forastera, 40% Biancolella and 10% San Lunardo.

Red wines produced under the Ischia DOC are composed of 50% Guarnaccia, 40% Piedirosso (known under the local synonym of Per'e Palummo) and 10% Barbera. Like the white wines, red grapes destined for DOC production are limited to a harvest yield of no more than 10 tonnes/ha though the minimum finished alcohol level is higher at 11.5% ABV.

Tourism
Ischia is a popular tourist destination, welcoming up to 6 million visitors per year, mainly from the Italian mainland as well as other European countries like Germany and the United Kingdom (approximately 5,000 Germans are resident on the island), although it has become an increasingly popular destination for Eastern Europeans. The number of Russian guests rose steadily from the 2000s onwards, before the number came to an almost complete standstill due to the currency depreciation of the ruble and COVID-19 pandemic.

From Ischia, various destinations such as Naples, Vesuvius, Amalfi Coast, Capri, Herculaneum, Paestum and the neighboring island Procida can be booked. Ischia is easily reached by ferry from Naples.The number of thermal spas on the islands makes it particularly popular with tourists seeking "wellness" holidays. A regular visitor was Angela Merkel, the former German chancellor.

Main sights

Aragonese Castle
The Aragonese Castle (Castello Aragonese, Ischia Ponte) was built on a rock near the island in 474 BC, by Hiero I of Syracuse. At the same time, two towers were built to control enemy fleets' movements. The rock was then occupied by Parthenopeans (the ancient inhabitants of Naples). In 326 BC, the fortress was captured by Romans and then again by the Parthenopeans. In 1441 Alfonso V of Aragon connected the rock to the island with a stone bridge instead of the prior wood bridge and fortified the walls in order to defend the inhabitants against the raids of pirates. Around 1700, approximately 2000 families lived on the islet, including a Poor Clares convent, an abbey of Basilian monks (of the Greek Orthodox Church), the bishop and the seminar, and the prince, with a military garrison. There were also thirteen churches. In 1912, the castle was sold to a private owner. Today the castle is the most visited monument on the island. It is accessed through a tunnel with large openings which let the light enter. Along the tunnel, there is a small chapel consecrated to Saint John Joseph of the Cross (San Giovan Giuseppe della Croce), the patron saint of the island. More comfortable access is also possible with a modern lift. After arriving outside, it is possible to visit the Church of the Immacolata and the Cathedral of Assunta. The first was built in 1737 on the location of a smaller chapel dedicated to Saint Francis and closed after the suppression of convents in 1806, as well as the Poor Clares convent.

Gardens of La Mortella

The gardens, located in Forio-San Francesco, were originally the property of the English composer William Walton.  Walton lived in the villa next to the gardens with his Argentinian wife Susana. When the composer arrived on the island in 1946, he immediately called Russell Page from England to lay out the garden. Wonderful tropical and Mediterranean plants were planted, and some have now reached amazing proportions. The gardens include wonderful views over the city and the harbour of Forio. A museum dedicated to the life and work of William Walton now comprises part of the garden complex. There's also a recital room where renowned musical artists perform on a regular schedule.

Villa La Colombaia
Villa La Colombaia is located in Lacco Ameno and Forio territories. Surrounded by a park, the villa (called "The Dovecote") was commissioned by Luigi Patalano, a famous local socialist and journalist. It is now the seat of a cultural institution and museum dedicated to Luchino Visconti. The institution promotes cultural activities such as music, cinema, theatre, art exhibitions, workshops and cinema reviews. The villa and the park are open to the public.

Others
Sant'Angelo  (Sant'Angelo, in the comune of Serrara Fontana)
Maronti Beach (Barano d'Ischia)
Church of the Soccorso' (Forio)
Piazza S.Restituta, with the best luxury boutiques (Lacco Ameno)
Bay of Sorgeto, with hot thermal springs (Panza)
Poseidon Gardens – spa with several thermal pools (Panza)
Citara Beach (Panza)
English's Beach (Ischia)
Pitthekoussai Archaeological museum
The Angelo Rizzoli museum
Giardini Ravino (Forio d'Ischia)

Voluntary associations 
Committees and associations work to promote tourism on the island and provide services and activities for residents. Among these are:
Il coniglio di Rocco Alfarano, associazione per la protezione del quadrupede sull'isola
Accaparlante Società Cooperativa Sociale, Via Sant'Alessandro
Associazione Donatori Volontari di Sangue, Via Iasolino, 1
Associazione Nemo per la Diffusione della Cultura del Mare, via Regina Elena, 75 Cellulare: 366-1270197
Associazione Progetto Emmaus, Via Acquedotto, 65
A.V.I. Associazione Volontariato e Protezione Civile Isola D'Ischia, Via Delle Terme, 88
Cooperativa Sociale Arkè onlus, Via delle Terme, 76/R Telefono: 081-981342
Cooperativa Sociale Asat Ischia onlus, Via delle Terme, 76/R Telefono: 081-3334228
Cooperativa Sociale kairòs onlus, Via delle Terme, 76/R
Kalimera Società Cooperativa Sociale, Via Fondo Bosso, 20
Pan Assoverdi Salvanatura, Via Delle Terme, 53/C
Prima Ischia – Onlus, Via Iasolino, 102

Town twinning
 Los Angeles, USA (2006)
 Cambridge, Massachusetts, USA (2006)
 Maloyaroslavets, Russia

Environmental problems
The sharp increase in population between the 1950s and 1980s and the growing inflow of tourists (in 2010, over 4 million tourists visited the island for at least one day) have increased the anthropic pressure on the island. Significant acreage of land previously used for agriculture has been developed for the construction of houses and residential structures. Most of this development has taken place without any planning and building permission. As at the end of 2011, the island lacked the most basic system for sewage treatment; sewage is sent directly to the sea. In 2004 one of the five communities of the island commenced civil works to build a sewage treatment plant, but the construction has not been completed since, and is currently stalled.

On 14 June 2007, one of the four high-voltage underwater cables connecting the island to the mainland grid became damaged. The line is maintained by Enel S.p.A., although never authorized by Italian authorities. The incident released pressurised oil into the sea resulting in pollution from polychlorobiphenyls (PCBs, the use of which was banned by the Italian authorities since 1984), polycyclic aromatic hydrocarbons (PAHs) and linear alkyl benzenes (aromatic hydrocarbons). The incident damaged the "Regno di Nettuno" protected marine area, the largest ecosystem in the Mediterranean Sea, designated as a "priority habitat" in Annex I to the Habitats Directive (92/43/EEC) and comprising oceanic posidonia beds.

In order to reduce pollution due to cars, Ischia has been the place of the first complete sustainable mobility project applied to an urban centre, created in 2017 with Enel in collaboration with Aldo Arcangioli under the name of "Green Island".

See also

List of islands of Italy
List of castles in Italy
List of volcanoes in Italy
Castello d'Ischia Lighthouse
2017 Ischia earthquake

References

Bibliography
Richard Stillwell, ed. Princeton Encyclopedia of Classical Sites, 1976:  "Aenaria (Ischia), Italy".
Ridgway, D. "The First Western Greeks" Cambridge University Press, 1993.

External links

Ischia Photos with maps [en]
Archaeology of Ischia  

 
Campanian volcanic arc
Castles in Italy
Complex volcanoes
Euboean colonies of Magna Graecia
Geography of the Metropolitan City of Naples
Islands of Campania
Roman sites of Campania
Stratovolcanoes of Italy
Volcanoes of the Tyrrhenian
Wine regions of Italy
Calderas of Italy
Submarine calderas